This is a list of Lebanese Australians including both original immigrants who obtained Australian citizenship and their Australian-born descendants who are notable, have made significant contributions to the Australian or international culture or society politically, artistically or scientifically, or have prominently appeared in the news.

Politics and public service 
 Alexander Alam, member of the New South Wales Legislative Council
 Marie Bashir, Governor of New South Wales
 Steve Bracks, Former Premier of Victoria
 Samier Dandan, President of Lebanese Muslim Association
 Khalil Eideh, CEO of Bluestar Logistics and member of the Victorian Legislative Council
 Nazih Elasmar, member of the Victorian Legislative Council
 Bob Katter, member for Federal Division of Kennedy since 1993
 Bob Katter, Sr., member for Federal Division of Kennedy 1966-1990
 Daryl Melham, member of the Australian House of Representatives
 Cesar Melhem, Victorian state secretary of Australian Workers' Union
 Eddie Obeid, Corrupt former Member of the NSW Legislative Council, former Minister for Fisheries and Mineral Resources
 Barbara Perry, NSW parliamentarian
 Sir Nicholas Shehadie, Lord Mayor of Sydney (1973–1975) and member of Australian Rugby Union Hall of Fame
 Michael Sukkar, federal government minister
 Salim Wardeh, Former Minister of Culture in Lebanon

Law and judiciary 
 Sam Doumany, Former Attorney-General and Minister for Justice in Queensland

Business 
 Stefan Ackerie, hairstyling entrepreneur
 Joseph Assaf, Multicultural Businessman
 Ahmed Fahour, Banker, former CEO of Citibank and NAB's operations, and current CEO of Australia Post
 Jacques Nasser, Former CEO of Ford Motors
 Joseph Saba, Fashion designer
 John Symond, Founder and Managing Director of Aussie Group
 Khalil Issa, Entrepreneur & CEO, former board member of several technology companies

Athletics 
 Matthew Abood, freestyle swimmer
 Sheik Ali, Heavyweight champion wrestler
 George Ayoub, Test match rugby referee, member of the Super Rugby panel for Television Match Officials
 Alex Chidiac, Professional women's soccer player for Melbourne City and the Matilda's
 Max Basheer, Former administrator with the South Australian National Football League
 David Bayssari, Former Balmain Tigers NRL Player & Lebanon Rugby League Head Coach
 Michael Cheika, Head coach of the Wallabies and the New South Wales Waratahs
 Hazem El Masri, Canterbury Bulldogs Rugby league player
 Benny Elias, Former National Rugby League player
 Joe Reaiche, Former National Rugby League Sydney Roosters player
 Ahmad Elrich, International soccer player
 Tarek Elrich, Newcastle United Jets soccer player
 Buddy Farah, FIFA agent - Ex soccer player
 Robbie Farah, South Sydney Rabbitohs Rugby league player
 Milham "Mil" Hanna, former Australian rules footballer with Carlton
 Bachar Houli, Australian Rules Football player
 Safwan Khalil, Olympic champion in taekwando
 Tim Mannah, Parramatta Eels Rugby league player
 Josh Mansour, Penrith Panthers Rugby league player
 Andrew Nabbout, soccer player for Melbourne Victory
 Brendan Nasser, Test Match rugby player, member of the winning Australian squad at the 1991 Rugby World Cup
 Roger Rasheed, international tennis coach and former player
 Michael Reda, International soccer player
 Travis Robinson, International rugby league footballer
 Reece Robinson, International rugby league footballer
 Adam Saad, Australian Rules Football player

Entertainment and media
 David Basheer, Sports Presenter and Commentator
 Firass Dirani, Actor
 Etcetera Etcetera, drag queen
 Faydee, Pop / R&B singer, songwriter
 Joe Hasham, actor
 Jan Fran, Journalist, news and current affairs commentator, TV personality
 Sabrina Houssami, 2006 Australian representative at Miss World
 Tamara Jaber, Singer
 Jessica Kahawaty, Beauty pageant contestant who came third in Miss World 2012 when representing Australia
 Paul Khoury, TV personality and voice talent
 Paul Nakad, actor and hip hop artist
 Daniella Rahme, TV host, actress and model
 Lincoln Younes, actor, model and voice over artist.
 Mariam Saab, television presenter and journalist
 Natalie Saleeba, Television actress
 Petra Yared, Australian television actor 
 Doris Younane, Actress
Susie Youssef, Comedian, Writer, Actor

Arts and literature
 Mireille Astore, Artist and writer
 David Malouf, writer

Other 
 Joe Hachem, 2005 World Series of Poker champion
 Fehmi Naji, Grand Mufti of Australia
 Keysar Trad, Muslim community spokesman

References

Australia
Australian people of Lebanese descent
Lebanese Australian
Lebanese
Asian-Australian culture